Dlhé diely is a neighborhood of Bratislava, the capital of Slovakia, part of the Karlova Ves borough in the Bratislava IV district. It is one of the newest residential quarters of the city, it is situated at the foothills of the Little Carpathians overlooking the river Danube, offering extensive views over Bratislava and Austria. Buildings in this part of the city are almost exclusively blocks of flats, although most of them relatively new. Formerly consisting of vineyards, woods and meadows next to Karlova Ves proper, during the 1980s and 1990s a residential planned for 12,000 people emerged, that today houses almost 30,000 inhabitants.

History 
The territory was previously a park/wood near Karlova Ves proper. The park was known as Langetheile before 1950 and as Dlhý diel from 1950 to 1976; both Langetheile (German) and Dlhé diely (Slovak) literally mean "long parts" or "long divisions".

The southern slopes of Dlhé diely were inhabited from the Paleolithic age, as evidenced by archaeological finds of tools.

Dlhé diely is one of the more attractive quarters in Bratislava for housing, though recently big problems with traffic have been emerging because of large number of people living there (and more coming).

Gallery

See also 
 Karlova Ves
 History of Bratislava

References

External links 
 Homepage of Karlova Ves
 Dlhé Diely Photos

Boroughs of Bratislava